The Sandman is a mythical character in European folklore who puts people to sleep and encourages and inspires beautiful dreams by sprinkling magical sand onto their eyes.

Representation in traditional folklore
The Sandman is a traditional character in many children's stories and books. In Scandinavian folklore, he is said to sprinkle sand or dust on or into the eyes of children at night to bring on sleep and dreams. The grit or "sleep" (rheum) in one's eyes upon waking is the supposed result of the Sandman's work the previous night.

Literature

 

E. T. A. Hoffmann (1776–1822) wrote a short story in 1816 titled Der Sandmann, which showed how sinister such a character could be made. According to the protagonist's nurse, he threw sand in the eyes of children who wouldn't sleep, with the result of those eyes falling out and being collected by the Sandman, who then takes the eyes to his iron nest on the Moon and uses them to feed his children. The protagonist of the story grows to associate this nightmarish creature with the genuinely sinister figure of his father's associate, Coppelius. In Romanian folklore there is a similar character, Moș Ene (Ene the Elder). Contrarily to the sandman, his bag is the place where he traps children who do not go to bed.

Hans Christian Andersen's 1841 folk tale Ole Lukøje introduced the Sandman, named Ole Lukøje, by relating dreams he gave to a young boy in a week through his magical technique of sprinkling dust in the eyes of the children. "Ole" is a Danish first name and "Lukøje" means "close eye". Andersen wrote:

In Norway and Sweden, he is called John or Jon Blund, and in the Netherlands, Belgium and parts of southern Africa, he is referred to as "Klaas Vaak".

Klaas Vaak is a character in a Dutch Musical 'De sprookjesmusical Klaas Vaak", has its own TV-series 'Fairytales of Klaas Vaak' and is one of the entertainers in the amusement park  'Efteling'.

Television

The East German stop motion children's television programme Unser Sandmännchen (Our Little Sandman), based on Hans Christian Andersen's Ole Lukøje character and the story by E. T. A. Hoffmann, has been broadcast since 1959, along with a West German version which was discontinued after reunification.

In the 1990s, Nilus the Sandman aired on Anglophone Canadian television.

In the 1970s, Bonne nuit les petits aired on French television. The show featured Nounours, a bear who took care of two toddlers, Nicolas and Pimprenelle. He would arrive on a cloud driven by his friend Sandman (“Le marchand de sable” in French) playing a flute as the sun set, and would only leave once he'd accompanied the children to bed. At the end of every episode, Nounours would say “Bonne nuit les petits” (which means “Good night, little ones”) before Sandman created a light shower of sand, putting the two siblings, Nicolas and Pimprenelle, to sleep. The bear and Sandman would then take their leave on the same cloud, once Nounours had climbed back up the ladder that he'd descended at the beginning of the episode. Here, Sandman has a major role to play, with his flute, driving the cloud, interacting with the other characters from time to time and, most importantly, inducing the children to fall asleep. 
The show was broadcast nightly at 7:50 pm, and each episode lasted 10 minutes, marking 8 pm as the bed-time when children, duly reassured, could sleep peacefully. It was later reduced to 5 minutes in the 1990s for the reboot series. In francophone Canada, it airs on Ici Radio-Canada Télé immediately before Le Téléjournal.

The Sandman appears in The Smurfs episodes "Darkness Monster" and "Lazy's Nightmare", voiced by Frank Welker.

In 1991, Paul Berry directed a stop-motion short film titled The Sandman based on the short story Der Sandmann by E. T. A. Hoffmann.

The Sandman appears in The Santa Clause 2 and The Santa Clause 3: The Escape Clause, portrayed by Michael Dorn. He is shown to be a member of the Council of Legendary Figures and tends to doze off during meetings, giving the other members cause to wake him up.

The Sandman is supposedly represented as the demon Der Kindestod in the series Buffy the Vampire Slayer.

Among the earlier productions of the British sci-fi television show Doctor Who following 2005 is an episode revolving around Sandmen. The ninth episode of the ninth season (2015), titled "Sleep No More", is a found footage video narrated by Gagan Rassmussen (Reece Shearsmith), a scientist and professor from the 38th century. Rassmussen manufactures a dangerous adventure involving Sandmen, intended to engage people to watch the video and by which an electronic signal transmits to the brains of others in order to create further Sandmen. The episode also makes use of the song "Mr. Sandman", written by Pat Ballard in 1954, as the Morpheus-machine theme.

The Sandman appears in Rise of the Guardians as a member of the Guardians.

Netflix released The Sandman series in 2022, an adaptation of the Neil Gaiman comics.

Comics
In Marvel Mystery Comics, the Sandman lives in the Land of Dreams, which is located in the Realm of Fairies within the potentially imaginary world of Nowhere. The Sandman ruled over the realm and would place a blanket over it every day. Those who grabbed a dream from the dream tree would have a dream based on whatever they grabbed from the tree and awaken again when the Sandman removed the blanket over his land. Anyone who did not grab a dream would end up in an eternal, dreamless sleep.

Several fictional characters by the name of Sandman have appeared in comic books published by DC Comics. These include fantasy writer Neil Gaiman's 75-part comic book series called The Sandman for Vertigo Comics (an imprint of DC Comics). The original series ran from 1989 to 1996. It tells the story of Dream of the Endless, who rules over the world of dreams. He is an anthropomorphic personification of dreams known to various characters throughout the series as Morpheus, Oneiros, the Shaper of Form, Lord of the Dreaming, the Dream King, Dream-Sneak, the Cat of Dreams, Murphy, Kai'ckul, and Lord L'Zoril. He possesses three symbols of office: a helm, an amulet known as the Dreamstone, and a sand pouch.

A comics adaption of the above-mentioned German TV show Unser Sandmännchen has also been published. Most notably on the back pages of FF Dabei focusing on Pittiplatsch and his friends.

Music
Songs based on the figure of the Sandman include the 1950s classic "Mr. Sandman" by The Chordettes, Roy Orbison's "In Dreams" in which the singer is put to sleep by "a candy-colored clown they call the sandman" to dream of his lost love, and Metallica's "Enter Sandman" whose lyrics "juxtapose childhood bedtime rituals and nightmarish imagery" and originally included a reference to crib death. The Sandman also appears in the song "Blood Red Sandman" by Lordi, "Mein Herz Brennt" by Rammstein, "Sandmann" by Oomph!, the 1971 song "Sandman" by America and the version of the lullaby "Morningtown Ride" recorded by The Seekers and is mentioned briefly in the songs “Headfirst Slide into Cooperstown on a Bad Bet” by Fall Out Boy and "Farewell and Goodnight" from the Smashing Pumpkins album Mellon Collie and the Infinite Sadness. Ed Sheeran's album = (Equals) contains a song name "Sandman" that refers to the sandman bringing magical dreams. Oranger also released a song titled "Mr. Sandman" with reference to the mythical character. In 2021 SYML record a song at St. Mark’s Cathedral called "Mr. Sandman".

See also
 Morpheus – Greek god of dreams

References

14. Rise of the guardians

Bibliography
 
 
 
 Wm. G. Thilgen Jr. (2013) The Sand Man (Lulu Press, Inc.)

External links
 

 
Dream
European folklore characters
Sleep in mythology and folklore